The Dr. Lovell House is a historic house on Walnut Street, between Main and Church Streets, in Bradford, Arkansas.  It is a two-story wood-frame structure, with a gabled roof, weatherboard siding, and a foundation of stone piers.  A two-story gabled section projects from the front, housing a porch supported on both levels by square posts with decorative brackets.  Built about 1900, it is one of White County's few surviving double-pen I-houses.

The house was listed on the National Register of Historic Places in 1992.

See also
National Register of Historic Places listings in White County, Arkansas

References

Houses on the National Register of Historic Places in Arkansas
Houses in White County, Arkansas
National Register of Historic Places in White County, Arkansas
1900 establishments in Arkansas
Houses completed in 1900
I-houses in Arkansas